Wodson Park Football Club is a football club from Ware, Hertfordshire. The club is affiliated to the Hertfordshire County Football Association. The men's section competed in the Spartan South Midlands League, but withdrew in October 2019.

History
The club was founded in 1997 and started competing in Division three of the Hertford and District Football League, and winning it at the first attempt. The club then had two more consecutive promotions, taking the Division one title en route to the Premier division. The 2006–07 season saw the club join Division one the Hertfordshire Senior County League. Their second season in the league saw the club finish runners up in Division one.

Instead of joining the Premier division of the Herts senior league, the club applied to join Division two of the Spartan South Midlands League for the 2008–09 campaign and were successful. The club played in Division two for two seasons before gaining promotion to Division one. The 2011–12 campaign saw the club make their debut in the FA Cup, where they met Oxhey Jets F.C. in the extra preliminary riound but lost 6–0. The men's team withdrew from the league in October 2019 due to difficulties in raising enough players to form a team.

Ground
Wodson Park's ground is located in Wodson Park Sports and Leisure Centre. This was where the club originally played their fixtures before moving to Ware F.C.'s ground of the same name, which is located next to the leisure centre. The club returned to their original ground in 2013. The pitch has a running track round it. New stand built for the 2015 season.

Honours
Hertfordshire Senior County League Division One:
 Runners-up (1): 2007–08
Hertford and District Football League Division Three:
 Winners (1): 1997–98

Records

Highest League Position: 5th in Spartan South Midlands League Division One 2017–18
FA Cup best performance: Extra Preliminary qualifying round 2011–12, 2012–13, 2018-19
FA Vase best performance: First round 2010–11 Second round 2018-2019

External links
 Official site

References 

Football clubs in England
Association football clubs established in 1997
Football clubs in Hertfordshire
1997 establishments in England
Ware, Hertfordshire
Hertford and District Football League
Hertfordshire Senior County League
Spartan South Midlands Football League
Wareside